Aurélien Montaroup (born 19 December 1985) is a French former football defender.

Career
Montaroup began his career by Stade Rennais F.C. but never turned professional there. Then he played by Dijon FCO, US Orléans, US Créteil-Lusitanos and La Vitréenne FC.

On 7 January 2009, Montaroup signed a contract with Belarus top club FC Dinamo Minsk.

Honours
 Coupe Gambardella: 2003

References

External links

USO Profile

1985 births
Living people
Footballers from Rennes
Association football defenders
French footballers
French expatriate footballers
Dijon FCO players
Stade Rennais F.C. players
US Créteil-Lusitanos players
FC Dinamo Minsk players
Stade Malherbe Caen players
Ligue 1 players
Ligue 2 players
Expatriate footballers in Belarus
La Vitréenne FC players
US Orléans players